Edgar Vance Starnes is a North Carolina politician and an investor in real estate. He served as a Republican member of the North Carolina House of Representatives for a total of approximately 20 years, from 1987–88 and from 1997 through January 2015. He then resigned to become legislative liaison for North Carolina State Treasurer Janet Cowell. At the time of his resignation, Starnes represented the state's eighty-seventh House district (Caldwell County).

North Carolina House of Representatives

He was elected House Majority Leader by his colleagues in December 2012, for the legislative session beginning in January 2013.  After the 2014 election, in which he was re-elected to the House without opposition, Starnes chose not to seek a second term as Majority Leader because he was already discussing the position with the State Treasurer's office.

Nullification resolution
In April 2013, Starnes and ten Republican colleagues introduced House Bill 494, a resolution in the Assembly which repudiates any federal court power in ruling on any Constitutional topic in North Carolina, a legally discredited theory known to historians of the antebellum U.S. as nullification.

"The Constitution of the United States does not grant the federal government and does not grant the federal courts the power to determine what is or is not constitutional; therefore, by virtue of the Tenth Amendment to the Constitution of the United States, the power to determine constitutionality and the proper interpretation and proper application of the Constitution is reserved to the states and to the people," the resolution asserts, continuing, "Each state in the union is sovereign and may independently determine how that state may make laws respecting an establishment of religion".

Electoral history

2014

2012

2010

2008

2006

2004

2002

2000

References

External links
Edgar V. Starnes" (North Carolina General Assembly Official Site)

|-

|-

Living people
1956 births
People from Granite Falls, North Carolina
20th-century American politicians
21st-century American politicians
Republican Party members of the North Carolina House of Representatives